Tan Tock Seng (1798 – 24 February 1850) was a Malacca-born merchant and philanthropist from Singapore.

Early life and business
Tan Tock Seng was born in Malacca in 1798 to a Chinese Fujianese immigrant father and local Peranakan mother. He left for Singapore in 1819 at the age of 21, the same year Stamford Raffles established a trading base on the island under the British East India Company. Tan made a living by selling vegetables, fruits, fish and other produce in the newly-built city center and eventually earned enough to open a store at Boat Quay in 1827. The store was situated at the mouth of the Singapore River.

He then invested in the J. H. Whitehead of Shaw, Whitehead & Company and engaged in property speculation, becoming wealthy in the process and acquiring large tracts of prime land. Tan owned 50 acres (200,000 m²) near the Tanjong Pagar railway station, disjointed land parcels from the Padang leading up to High Street and Tank Road, several Ellenborough Building shophouses, and even a fruit plantation.

Philanthropist
Tan became an influential Chinese leader and was the first Asian to be appointed Justice of the Peace by Governor William John Butterworth. He was also granted the title of Kapitan Cina (Captain of the Chinese) for settling feuds and assisting new Chinese immigrants upon their arrival to Singapore. The founding of Thian Hock Keng temple was led by Tan for the Hokkien community and still exists at Telok Ayer Street today.

His most famous donation was a $5,000 contribution to the construction of the Chinese Pauper Hospital in 1844, which was named after its benefactor on its opening and referred to colloquially as "Tan Tock Seng hospital". The hospital later relocated to the corner of Serangoon Road and Balestier Road in 1860, and a female wing was funded by Tan's widow Lee Seo Neo in 1867.

Death and legacy

Tan died on 24 February 1850 at the age of 52 after falling ill, leaving behind his wife, three sons and three daughters. His initial burial location is unknown but his remains were re-interred at Outram Hill around 1882. The modern day Tan Tock Seng Hospital and adjacent road Jalan Tan Tock Seng still bears his name.

References

Works cited

External links

 National Library Board article on Tan Tock Seng

1798 births
1850 deaths
Hokkien businesspeople
Malaysian emigrants to Singapore
Peranakan people in Malaysia
Singaporean people of Hokkien descent
Singaporean businesspeople
Singaporean philanthropists
Kapitan Cina
19th-century philanthropists